= Marianne Maury Kaufmann =

French author

Marianne Maury Kaufmann or Maury-Kaufmann is a French writer. She is the author of Varsovie-Les Lilas, Pas de chichis! and Dédé, enfant de bastard. She is also an illustrator and writes the weekly column "Gloria" in Version Femina.
